Mathieu Maton (born 19 January 1981) is a retired French footballer who played as a striker.

Career 
He was part of France squad at 2001 FIFA World Youth Championship.

References
Profile at footballdatabase.eu

1981 births
Living people
Association football forwards
French footballers
France youth international footballers
France under-21 international footballers
Lille OSC players
LB Châteauroux players
AS Cannes players
R.A.A. Louviéroise players
Royale Union Saint-Gilloise players
Wasquehal Football players